Northern Illinois Conference may refer to the following:

Northern Illinois Conference (United Methodist)
Northern Illinois Conference (athletic conference), a highschool athletics conference
 Northern Illinois-Iowa Conference, a defunct NCAA Division III college athletics conference
 Big Northern Conference (Illinois), a highschool athletics conference

See also
 North Conference (disambiguation)